George Raymond Swarbrick (born February 16, 1942) is a Canadian former professional ice hockey player. He played 132 National Hockey League (NHL) games with the Oakland Seals, Pittsburgh Penguins, and Philadelphia Flyers. Swarbrick was born in Moose Jaw, Saskatchewan.

Olympics
Swarbrick played for Canada in the 1964 Winter Olympics. He scored 3 goals and had 3 assists in 7 games played, but missed a medal as Canada finished in a three-way tie and controversially ended up in fourth place.

Career statistics

Regular season and playoffs

International

External links
 

1942 births
Living people
Baltimore Clippers players
Canadian ice hockey right wingers
Erie Blades players
Hershey Bears players
Ice hockey players at the 1964 Winter Olympics
Ice hockey people from Saskatchewan
Long Island Cougars players
Moose Jaw Canucks players
Oakland Seals players
Olympic ice hockey players of Canada
Omaha Knights (CHL) players
Philadelphia Firebirds (NAHL) players
Philadelphia Flyers players
Pittsburgh Penguins players
San Diego Gulls (WHL) players
San Francisco Seals (ice hockey) players
Sportspeople from Moose Jaw